The 2015 New Zealand Warriors season was the 21st in the club's history. Coached by Andrew McFadden and captained by Simon Mannering, the Warriors competed in the National Rugby League's 2015 Telstra Premiership. They also competed in the 2015 NRL Auckland Nines tournament.

Milestones
13 February: Manu Vatuvei and Nathan Friend were selected to play for the NRL All Stars team in the NRL All Stars game.
7 March – round 1: Solomone Kata, Bodene Thompson, Ryan Hoffman, Sam Lisone and Albert Vete made their debut for the club. Kata, Lisone and Vete were also making their first grade debut.
15 March – round 2: Jonathan Wright made his debut for the club.
21 March – round 3: Nathan Friend played in his 200th NRL match. Ben Henry also played in his 50th NRL match.
29 March – round 4: Matt Allwood made his debut for the club.
6 April – round 5: Ryan Hoffman played in his 250th NRL match.
11 April – round 6: Manu Vatuvei played in his 200th match for the Warriors.
25 April – round 8: Raymond Faitala-Mariner made his first grade debut.
2 May: Bunty Afoa, Marata Niukore, Toafofoa Sipley and Jazz Tevaga played for the Junior Kiwis. Dominique Peyroux and Sam Lisone represented Samoa while Tuimoala Lolohea, Konrad Hurrell, Solomone Kata and Albert Vete played for Tonga.
3 May: Shaun Johnson, Thomas Leuluai, Simon Mannering, Ben Matulino, Manu Vatuvei all played for the New Zealand national rugby league team in the 2015 Anzac Test.
16 May – round 10: Ken Maumalo made his first grade debut.
May to July: Ryan Hoffman represented New South Wales and Jacob Lillyman represented Queensland in the 2015 State of Origin series.
13 June – round 14: Manu Vatuvei scored his 10th try of the season, becoming the first player to score 10 tries in 10 consecutive seasons.
27 June – round 15: Jacob Lillyman played in his 200th NRL match and Bodene Thompson played in his 100th NRL match.
19 July – round 19: Shaun Johnson played in his 100th match for the Warriors.
22 August – round 24: Mason Lino made his first grade debut.
8 October: Tuimoala Lolohea and Ben Matulino were named in the squad for the New Zealand tour of Great Britain. Sam Tomkins was also named in the England squad.
17 October: Solomone Kata and Albert Vete played for Tonga in a World Cup qualifier.

Jersey and sponsors

Fixtures

Pre-season training
The bulk of the Warriors' 2015 NRL squad began preseason training on 3 November 2014.

Auckland Nines
The Warriors finished second in the Hunua pool at the 2015 NRL Auckland Nines before being eliminated by the Cronulla Sharks in the quarterfinals.

The squad for the Nines was Shaun Johnson (c), Matthew Allwood, Nathan Friend, Ben Henry, Ryan Hoffman, Solomone Kata, Ngani Laumape, Sam Lisone, Tuimoala Lolohea, Sione Lousi, Suaia Matagi, Ben Matulino, Ken Maumalo, Nathaniel Roache, Bodene Thompson, Sam Tomkins, Chad Townsend and Manu Vatuvei. Simon Mannering, Dominique Peyroux, Sebastine Ikahihifo and Jonathan Wright were originally named in a 22-man training squad.

Solomone Kata was named in the team of the tournament.

Pre-season matches
The Warriors were planning to host the St. George Illawarra Dragons at Trafalgar Park in Nelson, however the match was cancelled when the Dragons were invited to compete in the World Club Series. It would have been the first time the Warriors had played in Nelson.

Regular season
All home matches were played at Mount Smart Stadium in Auckland, with the exception of the Round 22 match, which was played at Westpac Stadium in Wellington. It was the third year in a row the Warriors took a match to Wellington, as part of the "Capital Clash".

Ladder

Squad

Staff
Chief executive Officer: Jim Doyle
General manager: Don Mann Jr
General manager Football Operations: Dean Bell
Medical Services Manager: John Mayhew
Welfare and Education Manager: Jerry Seuseu
Media and Communications Manager: Richard Becht

Coaching staff
NRL head coach: Andrew McFadden
NRL assistant coach: Tony Iro
NRL assistant coach: Andrew Webster
NSW Cup head coach: Stacey Jones
NSW Cup assistant coach: George Carmont
NSW Cup assistant coach: Willie Swann
NYC head coach: Kelvin Wright

Transfers

Gains

Losses

Other teams
As in 2014, the Warriors entered a team into the NSW Cup and the Junior Warriors competed in the Holden Cup.

NSW Cup squad

The Warriors NSW Cup side finished fourth in the regular season, however lost two consecutive play-off matches and were eliminated from the play-offs. John Palavi was named in the competition's team on the year.

Holden Cup squad

The Junior Warriors finished 7th to make the finals. They defeated the Roosters and the Broncos before being eliminated by the Penrith Panthers in the preliminary final.

Club awards
Ben Matulino was named as the Warriors player of the year, his second time winning the award. The other finalists for the award were Simon Mannering and Shaun Johnson.

Johnson was awarded the People's choice award, Albert Vete was named the Club person of the year and Tuimoala Lolohea was named the NRL rookie of the year.

John Palavi was named the NSW Cup side's player of the year, while Mason Lino was the sides rookie of the year.

Bunty Afoa was the Junior Warrior's player of the year, while Ata Hingano was the rookie of the year.

References

External links
Warriors 2015 season rugby league project

New Zealand Warriors seasons
New Zealand Warriors season
Warriors season